For over two decades in the early twentieth century, there existed a network of streetcars in Reno that served as the main mode of public transit in Reno, Nevada, United States. The system consisted of a streetcar network in the area of Reno and Sparks, Nevada, as well as an interurban line between Reno and the Moana Springs resort.

Reno's streetcar network operated from Thanksgiving Day in 1904 to September 1927.

To the present day, the early twentieth century streetcar network in Reno, Nevada is the only streetcar or light rail system that has ever operated in the state of Nevada.

History

Background 

There were only a few settlers in the Reno area after 1850, until the discovery of silver in the Comstock Lode which led to a silver rush in the area and resulted in more settlers in Reno. By January 1863, the Central Pacific Railroad (CPRR) had begun laying tracks east from Sacramento, California, in order to connect with the Union Pacific Railroad at Promontory, Utah, and form the First transcontinental railroad. Once the railroad station was established, the town of Reno officially came into being on May 9, 1868. In 1871, Reno became the county seat of the newly expanded Washoe County, replacing the previous county seat, located at Washoe City.

After the opening of the Transcontinental Railroad, branch railroads began to connect with the first Transcontinental Railroad.  For example, the Virginia and Truckee Railroad was extended to Reno in 1872, which provided a boost to the new city's economy. These railroads hauled lumber from Carson City to the mines, and ore from the mines out to the main Transcontinental Railroad. In 1885, the University of Nevada (then called Nevada State University) moved from Elko to Reno.

Reno's streetcar system 

By the early 1900s, Reno was large enough that the establishment of an electric streetcar system for public transit in the city was justified. A group of local businessmen organized the Nevada Transit Company, with the aim of building an electric streetcar line.  The line, which traveled the  route between Reno and the newly founded town of Sparks, Nevada, was constructed in just four months, and opened with a celebration on Thanksgiving Day, 1904.

This initial streetcar line ran from Reno's downtown railway node eastward to Sparks, turning south just before Deer Park, then east to run to the Southern Pacific roundhouse and railroad yards. The portion of the line in Reno proper traveled west along Fourth Street to Sierra Street, then south to Second Street, east to Virginia Street, and south again to the Truckee River. In January 1905, the line's route was extended over the Truckee River on the Virginia Street Bridge. The car barn for the streetcar company stood at 911 E. 4th Street, near Morrill Avenue.

The streetcar service was purchased in 1906 and was renamed the Reno Traction Company. Streetcars were used heavily by commuting workers, shoppers, and pleasure-seekers headed to Wieland’s Park (later known as Coney Island), with the Reno-Sparks line being by far the most popular and generating 80% of all ridership. With an initial fare of ten cents, the journey from Reno to Sparks took approximately thirty minutes, with the streetcar traveling at just ten miles per hour.

Later expansions connected downtown Reno to the University of Nevada to the north of downtown. A separate company, the Nevada Interurban, offered interurban service southward along Plumas Street to the Moana Springs resort.

The decline of Reno's streetcar network 

However, the increasing popularity of automobiles, as well as the high cost of track maintenance, soon led to the decline of streetcars in Reno.

Facing declining patronage, the Reno Traction Company stopped service on every route in Reno in 1919, except for the Reno-Sparks line.

Intercity bus service between Reno and Sparks began on June 15, 1927, attracting away the remaining streetcar line's customers.  Operations on the Reno-Sparks line ended soon afterwards, in September 1927.  This was the final end of Reno's over two decade experiment with a streetcar system.

Potential streetcar revival discussions 

On October 11, 2009, Reno opened up a new bus rapid transit (BRT) line called RTC Rapid along Virginia Street, sharing a portion of its route with Reno's original streetcar line.  Around the time of the opening of the RTC Rapid line, some discussions of ultimately converting the BRT line to a streetcar line arose.  However, there have been no further discussion of converting the BRT line to a streetcar line since that time, and there is no mention of building a streetcar line in Reno's long-range transportation plan.

See also 
 List of streetcar systems in the United States (all-time list)

References 

Passenger rail transportation in Nevada
Railway lines opened in 1904
Public transportation in Nevada
Transportation in Reno, Nevada
Railway lines closed in 1927
Defunct Nevada railroads
Electric railways in Nevada
Reno